The Comprehensive and Progressive Agreement for Trans-Pacific Partnership (CPTPP), also known as TPP11 or TPP-11, is a trade agreement among Australia, Brunei, Canada, Chile, Japan, Malaysia, Mexico, New Zealand, Peru, Singapore, and Vietnam. It evolved from the Trans-Pacific Partnership (TPP), which was never ratified due to the withdrawal of the United States. The eleven signatories have combined economies representing 13.4 percent of global gross domestic product, at approximately  trillion, making the CPTPP one of the world's largest free-trade areas by GDP, along with the United States–Mexico–Canada Agreement, the European Single Market, and the Regional Comprehensive Economic Partnership.

The TPP had been signed on 4 February 2016 but never entered into force, as the U.S. withdrew from the agreement soon after the election of president Donald Trump. All other TPP signatories agreed in May 2017 to revive the agreement, with Shinzo Abe's administration in Japan widely reported as taking the leading role in place of the U.S. In January 2018, the CPTPP was created as a succeeding agreement, retaining two-thirds of its predecessor's provisions; 22 measures favored by the U.S. but contested by other signatories were suspended, while the threshold for enactment was lowered so as not to require U.S. accession.

The formal signing ceremony was held on 8 March 2018 in Santiago, Chile. The agreement specifies that its provisions enter into effect 60 days after ratification by at least half the signatories (six of the eleven participating countries). On 31 October 2018, Australia was the sixth nation to ratify the agreement; it subsequently came into force for the initial six ratifying countries on 30 December 2018.

The chapter on state-owned enterprises (SOEs) requires signatories to share information about SOEs with each other, with the intent of engaging with the issue of state intervention in markets. It includes the most detailed standards for intellectual property of any trade agreement, as well as protections against intellectual property theft against corporations operating abroad.

The CPTPP commission in 2023 is chaired by New Zealand.

Negotiations 
During the round of negotiations held concurrently with the Asia-Pacific Economic Cooperation forum in Vietnam in November 2017, the Canadian prime minister Justin Trudeau refused to sign the agreement in principle, stating reservations about the provisions on culture and automotives. Media outlets in Australia, New Zealand, and Japan, which strongly supported quick movement on a deal, strongly criticized what they portrayed as Canadian sabotage.

Canada insisted that cultural and language rights, specifically related to its French-speaking minority, be protected.

However, Canada's major reservation was a conflict between the percentage of a vehicle that must originate in a CPTPP member nation to enter tariff-free, which was 45% under the original TPP language and 62.5% under the NAFTA agreement. Japan, which is a major automobile part exporter, strongly supports lower requirements. In January 2018, Canada announced that it would sign the CPTPP after obtaining binding side letters on culture with every other CPTPP member country, as well as bilateral agreements with Japan, Malaysia, and Australia related to non-tariff barriers. Canada's Auto Parts Manufacturers' Association sharply criticized increasing the percentages of automobile parts that may be imported tariff-free, noting that the United States was moving in the opposite direction by demanding stricter importation standards in the ongoing NAFTA renegotiation.

In February 2019, Canada's Jim Carr, Minister of International Trade Diversification, delivered a keynote address at a seminar concerning CPTPP - Expanding Your Business Horizons, reaching out to businesses stating the utilisation of the agreement provides a bridge that will enable people, goods and services to be shared more easily.

The final text of CPTPP was mostly identical to the original TPP, except for some provisions advanced by the US under the TPP, but not supported by the other members. In the intellectual property chapter, copyright and patent terms were shortened relative to TPP, and standards for digital IP protections were eliminated. Provisions allowing use of investor–state dispute settlements for investment agreements and authorizations were also rescinded.

Ratifications 
On 28 June 2018, Mexico became the first country to finish its domestic ratification procedure of the CPTPP, with President Enrique Peña Nieto stating, "With this new generation agreement, Mexico diversifies its economic relations with the world and demonstrates its commitment to openness and free trade."

On 6 July 2018, Japan became the second country to ratify the agreement.

On 19 July 2018, Singapore became the third country to ratify the agreement and deposit its instrument of ratification.

On 17 October 2018, the Australian Federal Parliament passed relevant legislation through the Senate. The official ratification was deposited on 31 October 2018. This two-week gap made Australia the sixth signatory to deposit its ratification of the agreement, and it came into force 60 days later.

On 25 October 2018, New Zealand ratified the CPTPP, increasing the number of countries that had formally ratified the agreement to four.

Also on 25 October 2018, Canada passed and was granted royal assent on the enabling legislation. The official ratification was deposited on 29 October 2018.

On 2 November 2018, the CPTPP and related documents were submitted to the National Assembly of Vietnam for ratification. On 12 November 2018, the National Assembly passed a resolution unanimously ratifying the CPTPP. The Vietnamese government officially notified New Zealand of its ratification on 15 November 2018.

On 14 July 2021, the CPTPP was approved by the Congress of the Republic of Peru. The official ratification was deposited on 21 July 2021.

On 30 September 2022, Malaysia ratified the CPTPP and deposited its instrument of ratification.

On 17 April 2019, the CPTPP was approved by the Chamber of Deputies of Chile. The final round of approval in the Senate was scheduled for November 2019, after being approved by its Commission of Constitution. However, due to a series of massive protests against the government of Sebastián Piñera, the ratification process was paused. Only in 2022, the ratification process was resumed after a new Congress and a new President were elected. Despite the public opposition of Gabriel Boric to the treaty before his election as President, the new administration didn't interfere in the voting. The CPTPP was approved in the Senate with 27 votes in favor (mainly from the right-wing opposition and some center-left politicians) and 10 against, mostly by members of the ruling coalition. The treaty was deposited on 23 December, once several side letters were negotiated with the other signatories in specific topics considered harmful by the Chilean government. On 23 February 2023, Boric ratified Chile's entry to TPP-11.

An overview of the legislative process in selected states is shown below:

Entry into force 
The agreement came into effect 60 days after ratification and deposit of accession documents by at least half the signatories (six of the eleven signatories). Australia was the sixth country to ratify the agreement, which was deposited with New Zealand on 31 October 2018, and consequently the agreement came into force between Australia, Canada, Japan, Mexico, New Zealand, and Singapore on 30 December 2018.

On 1 January 2019, Australia, Canada, Mexico, New Zealand, and Singapore implemented a second round of tariff cuts. Japan's second tariff cut took place on 1 April 2019.

On 15 November 2018, Vietnam deposited the accession documents, and the agreement entered into force in Vietnam on 14 January 2019.

On 21 July 2021, Peru deposited the accession documents, and the agreement entered into force in Peru on 19 September 2021.

On 30 September 2022, Malaysia deposited the accession documents, and the agreement entered into force in Malaysia on 29 November 2022.

On 23 December 2022, Chile deposited the accession documents, and the agreement entered into force in Chile on 21 February 2023.

CPTPP Commission 
The CPTPP Commission is the decision-making body of the CPTPP, which was established when the CPTPP entered into force on 30 December 2018.

1st CPTPP Commission (2019)
Representatives from the eleven CPTPP signatories participated in the 1st CPTPP Commission meeting held in Tokyo on 19 January 2019, which decided:

 A decision about the chairing and administrative arrangements for the commission and special transitional arrangements for 2019;
 A decision to establish the accession process for interested economies to join the CPTPP; Annex
 A decision to create rules of procedure and a code of conduct for disputes involving Parties to the; Annex; Annex I
 A decision to create a code of conduct for investor-State dispute settlement.; Annex* Members of the CPTPP Commission also issued a joint ministerial statement on 19 January 2019.

2nd CPTPP Commission (2019)
The 2nd CPTPP Commission meeting was held on 9 October 2019 in Auckland, New Zealand. Alongside the commission, the following Committees met for the first time in Auckland: Trade in Goods; Rules of Origin; Agricultural Trade; Technical Barriers to Trade; Sanitary and Phytosanitary Measures; Small and Medium Sized Enterprises; State Owned Enterprises; Development; Cooperation and Capacity Building; Competitiveness and Business Facilitation; Environment; and the Labour Council. The Commission adopted two formal decisions, (i) on its Rules of Procedure under Article 27.4 and (ii) to establish a Roster of Panel Chairs as provided for under Article 28.11.

3rd CPTPP Commission (2020)
The 3rd CPTPP Commission meeting was held virtually and hosted by Mexico on 5 August 2020.

4th CPTPP Commission (2021)
The 4th CPTPP Commission meeting was held virtually and hosted by Japan on 2 June 2021. The Commission decided to move forward with the application of the United Kingdom as an aspirant economy.

5th CPTPP Commission (2021)
The 5th CPTPP Commission meeting was held virtually and hosted by Japan on 1 September 2021. The Commission decided to  establish a Committee on Electronic Commerce composed of government representatives of each Party.

6th CPTPP Commission (2022)
The 6th CPTPP Commission meeting was held on 8 October 2022 and hosted by Singapore.

7th CPTPP Commission (2023)
The 7th CPTPP Commission meeting is scheduled to be held on 15 July 2023 in New Zealand.

Enlargement 
CPTPP rules require all eleven signatories to agree to the admission of additional members.

Current applicants

United Kingdom

In January 2018, the government of the United Kingdom stated it was exploring membership of the CPTPP to stimulate exports after Brexit and has held informal discussions with several of the members. The country has a small overseas territory, the Pitcairn Islands, in the Pacific Ocean. In October 2018, Japanese Prime Minister Shinzo Abe said he would welcome the United Kingdom joining the partnership post-Brexit. In a joint Telegraph article with Simon Birmingham, David Parker, and Chan Chun Sing, the trade ministers of Australia, New Zealand, and Singapore, U.K. Secretary of State for Trade, Liz Truss, expressed the United Kingdom's intent to join the CPTPP.

The U.K. Department for Trade's chief negotiator Crawford Falconer helped lead the New Zealand negotiations for the predecessor Trans-Pacific Partnership before leaving the Ministry of Foreign Affairs and Trade in 2012.

In June 2020, the government of the United Kingdom issued a policy paper reaffirming the U.K.'s position on accession to the CPTPP. There were three reasons given:
 Securing increased trade and investment opportunities that will help the U.K. economy overcome the unprecedented challenge posed by coronavirus. Joining CPTPP would open up new opportunities for U.K. exporters in strategically important sectors and helping to support an industrial revival in the U.K.
 Helping the United Kingdom diversify trading links and supply chains, and in doing so increasing economic security at a time of heightened uncertainty and disruption in the world.
 Assisting the U.K.'s future place in the world and advancing the U.K.'s longer-term interests. CPTPP membership is an important part of our strategy to place the U.K. at the centre of a modern, progressive network of free trade agreements with dynamic economies. Doing so would turn the U.K. into a global hub for businesses and investors wanting to trade with the rest of the world.

Furthermore, the U.K. government stated that in 2019, each region and nation of the U.K. exported at least £1 billion ($1.25 billion) worth of goods to CPTPP member countries. The U.K. government also highlighted that U.K. companies held close to £98 billion worth of investments in CPTPP countries in 2018 and that in 2019, the U.K. did more than £110 billion ($137 billion) worth of trade with countries in the CPTPP free trade area. In December 2020 the U.K.'s Secretary of State for Trade Liz Truss further expressed her desire for the U.K. to formally apply in early 2021. In a speech, held on January 20, 2021, Truss announced the U.K. planned to submit an application for participation "shortly". In October 2020 the United Kingdom and Japan already signed the UK–Japan Comprehensive Economic Partnership Agreement which was a roll over of the agreement between the EU and Japan.

The U.K. government has not produced an impact assessment that explains or quantifies the benefits it expects for the U.K. economy from accession to CPTPP. As such, it is a matter of dispute in U.K. as to whether accession is worth pursuing for economic reasons. Farmer, environmental and consumer groups have all raised concerns that the U.K. government will need to agree to lowering standards on pesticides, pig welfare and food labelling. These concerns have also been raised by the Scottish government.

On 1 February 2021, the United Kingdom formally applied to join CPTPP. The U.K. is the first non-founding country to apply to join the CPTPP. If successful, the U.K. would become the second largest CPTPP economy, after Japan.
Japan had expressed support for the U.K.'s potential entry into CPTPP in 2018,
and as 4th CPTPP Commission (2021) chair, Japan's minister in charge of negotiations on the trade pact, Yasutoshi Nishimura, expressed hope on Twitter that Britain will "demonstrate its strong determination to fully comply with high-standard obligations" of the free trade accord, and mentioned that "I believe that the U.K.’s accession request will have a great potential to expand the high-standard rules beyond the Asia-Pacific."

In June 2021, the CPTPP states agreed to open accession talks. A working group is expected to be established to discuss tariffs and rules governing investment and trade. The U.K. is not expected to accede to the CPTPP until 2022 at the earliest.

On 18 February 2022, confirmation came from the Japanese government, as Chair of the UK’s Accession Working Group on behalf of the CPTPP members, that the UK has moved into the second (and final) ‘market access’ phase of negotiations with the CPTPP.

China
In May 2020, China's Premier Li Keqiang said that China was willing to consider joining CPTPP. Meanwhile, China's leader Xi Jinping said at an Asia-Pacific Economic Cooperation (APEC) summit in November 2020 that China would “actively consider” joining CPTPP.

In December 2020, Japan Foreign Minister Toshimitsu Motegi has said that "TPP-11 sets high standards for regulations on e-commerce, intellectual property and state-owned enterprises", suggesting the amount of government intervention in the Chinese economy will not meet CPTPP requirements.

China's application to CPTPP is unlikely to gain traction. Although not a member of CPTPP, the U.S. can exercise the "poison pill" within the United States–Mexico–Canada Agreement that prevents Canada and Mexico from voting in favor of the Chinese application.

On 16 September 2021, China formally applied to join CPTPP. Reactions from CPTPP members after the Chinese application:

Japan Economy Minister Yasutoshi Nishimura was quoted by Reuters; "Japan believes that it's necessary to determine whether China, which submitted a request to join the TPP-11, is ready to meet its extremely high standards"; indicating that Japan will not support the Chinese application under the current circumstances.

Former Australian Trade Minister Dan Tehan indicated that Australia would oppose China's application until China halts trade strikes against Australian exports and resumes minister-to-minister contacts with the Australian government. Also, Australia has lodged disputes against China in the WTO on restrictions imposed by China on exports of barley and wine.

Taiwan
Taiwan applied to join CPTPP on 22 September 2021.

It had previously expressed interest to join TPP in 2016. After TPP's evolution to CPTPP in 2018, Taiwan indicated its will to continue efforts to join CPTPP. In December 2020, the Taiwanese government stated that it would submit an application to join CPTPP following the conclusion of informal consultations with existing members.
In February 2021 again, Taiwan indicated its will to apply to join CPTPP at an appropriate time. A few days after China submitted its request to join the CPTPP, Taiwan sent its own request to join the CPTPP, a move that has been one of the main policy objectives of Tsai Ing-wen's government.

Ecuador
Ecuador has filed its application to join the CPTPP trade pact on 29 December 2021 as the country moves to reduce its reliance on oil and diversify its economy through exports.

Costa Rica
Costa Rica has filed its application to join the CPTPP trade pact on 11 August 2022.

Uruguay
Uruguay filed its application to join the CPTPP trade pact on 1 December 2022.

Potential applicants

South Korea
In January 2021, South Korea’s Moon administration announced it would seek to join CPTPP. The country will examine sanitary and phytosanitary measures, fisheries subsidies, digital trade and guidelines related to state-run enterprises to meet the requirements that CPTPP has suggested. The South Korean government formally announced it will begin its application to join CPTPP in December 2021.

Thailand
Foreign Minister Don Pramudwinai is expected to submit a letter of intent soon for the country to apply to join the pact to the cabinet for its approval. A campaign against joining the pact called "#NoCPTPP" which has gathered 400,000 signatures has demanded the prime minister to not consider joining the pact.

Philippines
The Philippines previously wanted to join the TPP in 2016 under Benigno Aquino, who said that the country stood to gain from becoming a member of the trade pact.

Former TPP signatory not involved in CPTPP

United States
On 25 January 2018, U.S. President Donald Trump in an interview announced his interest in possibly rejoining the TPP if it were a "substantially better deal" for the United States. He had withdrawn the U.S. from the original agreement in January 2017. On 12 April 2018, he told the White House National Economic Council Director Larry Kudlow and U.S. Trade Representative Robert Lighthizer to look into joining CPTPP. U.S. Wheat Associates President Vince Peterson had said in December 2018 that American wheat exporters could face an “imminent collapse” in their 53% market share in Japan due to exclusion from CPTPP. Peterson added, “Our competitors in Australia and Canada will now benefit from those [CPTPP] provisions, as U.S. farmers watch helplessly.” The National Cattlemen's Beef Association stated that exports of beef to Japan, America's largest export market, would be at a serious disadvantage to Australian exporters as their tariffs on exports to Japan would be cut by 27.5% during the first year of CPTPP.

In December 2020, a bipartisan group of U.S. policy experts, Richard L. Armitage and Joseph S. Nye Jr., called for Washington to join the CPTPP, but this call was rejected by Secretary of Commerce Gina Raimondo when meeting Japanese government leaders on 15 November 2021. Raimondo stated that the Biden administration will not be joining CPTPP but is instead planning to create a new trade framework to surpass CPTPP in nearly the whole Indo-Pacific region.

Enlargement summary

Criticism
Economist José Gabriel Palma has criticized the treaty for severely restricting the sovereignty of the signatories. Signatories are subject to international courts and have restrictions on what their state-owned enterprises can do. According to Palma the treaty makes it difficult for countries to implement policies aimed to diversify exports thus becoming a so-called middle income trap. Palma also accuses that the treaty is reinforcing unequal relations by being drafted to reflect the laws of the United States.

In the case of Chile, Palma holds the treaty is redundant regarding the possibilities of trade as Chile has already trade treaties with ten of its members. On the contrary, economist Klaus Schmidt–Hebbel consider that the CPTPP "deepening" of already existing trade relations of Chile is a point in favour of it. In the view of Schmidt-Hebbel approving the treaty is important for the post-Covid economic recovery of Chile and wholly in line with the economic policies of Chile since the 1990s.

See also
Free-trade area
Market access
Regional Comprehensive Economic Partnership
Indo-Pacific Economic Framework
Rules of origin
Tariff

References

External links

Agreement text
TPP text (largely incorporated in this agreement)
Consolidated text of CPTPP and TPP

Treaties concluded in 2018
Trade blocs
Trans-Pacific Partnership
Free trade agreements of Mexico
Free trade agreements of Japan
Free trade agreements of Singapore
Free trade agreements of Canada
Free trade agreements of New Zealand
Free trade agreements of Australia
Free trade agreements of Vietnam
Free-trade areas
2018 in Chile
Foreign relations of Chile
Economy of Malaysia
Foreign relations of Vietnam
Treaties entered into force in 2018